This is a list of all Hardy Boys books published, by series.

The Hardy Boys Mystery Stories (1927–2005)

Grosset & Dunlap

Simon & Schuster
In 1979, the Hardy Boys books began to be published by Wanderer Books Simon & Schuster in paperback format. Though formatted differently from the original 58-volume series which continued under Grosset & Dunlap's control, these new books were published under the Hardy Boys Mystery Stories banner. These books feature increasingly contemporary cover illustrations and some books have multiple versions of the cover art.

To collectors of Hardy Boys and Nancy Drew books, books in the original series published at Simon & Schuster are called "Digests". This is due to the books resembling Digest-size paperbacks, differing from Grosset & Dunlap's hardcover books (one of the reasons Adams switched to Simon & Schuster was that Grosset & Dunlap did not like this move, while Simon & Schuster agreed to it).

In 2005, the first eight volumes from Wanderer (#59-66) were republished by Grosset & Dunlap, alongside the first eight Nancy Drew volumes from Wanderer. These republications went out of print in 2013.

Wanderer editions
The main plot, formula, and continuity of the books remained similar to the original Grosset & Dunlap books still being published at the time. After Harriet Adams died in 1982, the Syndicate continued with five of its partners (Adams' remaining three children, plus authors Nancy Axelrod and Lilo Wuenn), until its sale to Simon & Schuster in 1987.

Night of the Werewolf was originally listed as the next book at the end of Sting of the Scorpion. Grosset & Dunlap continued to list this until they lost a court case against the Syndicate and Simon & Schuster in May 1980. The book was later revised to eliminate the next title and instead referenced the first book in the series, The Tower Treasure. They later published Night of the Werewolf and the next seven titles in 2005, with the permission and collaboration of Simon & Schuster. These last eight titles were discontinued once the license ran out.

Minstrel editions
After volume 85, the series took a two-and-a-half-year hiatus due to the sale of the Stratemeyer Syndicate to Simon & Schuster. At this point, book packager Mega-Books took over the series, and hired different ghostwriters for the job (many of whom are still unknown).  Mega-Books worked on the series until #153 Eye On Crime in 1998.  Starting with #154 The Caribbean Cruise Caper, Simon & Schuster handled all books internally. The ghostwriters who are known are ones who have either been discovered through other resources, or have publicly revealed themselves as a ghostwriter for the series.

Aladdin editions
With the new millennium, the series changed publishers to the Aladdin subdivision of Simon & Schuster. With the reboot of Nancy Drew into Girl Detective, coupled with declining sales, Simon & Schuster ended the original series in April 2005.

Nancy Drew and the Hardy Boys: Be a Detective Mystery Stories (1984–1985)
In these books the reader controls the outcome of the story by choosing different options of advancing the plot, similar to the Choose Your Own Adventure books.

 The Secret of the Knight’s Sword
 Danger on Ice
 The Feathered Serpent
 Secret Cargo
 The Alaskan Mystery
 The Missing Money Mystery

The Hardy Boys Casefiles Series (1987–1998)
The Hardy Boys Casefiles are aimed at early-to-mid teen readers and have more mature themes, including espionage, murder, and slight romance. The new direction the series would take was set in the first volume, Dead On Target, as a bomb planted in the Hardy Boys' car blows up Joe's longtime girlfriend, Iola Morton, in the first chapter. Book packager Mega-Books and Simon & Schuster released the first two Casefiles under the Archway imprint in April 1987 and continued to release a new title monthly until November 1997. In January 1998 the last Casefile, #127 Dead in the Water, was released. This series was published in mass-market, or rack-sized, paperbacks to widen the distribution of the books to supermarkets and other outlets. In September 1987 the Hardy Boys Digest series was revived and continued with #86 The Mystery of the Silver Star.  Events from the Casefiles are not referenced in the Digest series, and Iola Morton is alive and connected with Joe Hardy as in the previous 85 titles. The Casefiles universe also merges with the Nancy Drew Files and Tom Swift worlds in titles published as A Nancy Drew and Hardy Boys SuperMystery and A Hardy Boys and Tom Swift UltraThriller. Several spin-off series were cancelled by Simon & Schuster at the end of 1997, including The Hardy Boys Casefiles.

In addition, there were three unpublished titles, only two of them known: Book #128, titled Explosive Force, was written by Jerry Novick, and a complete manuscript exists; Book #130, titled The Crisscross Crime, was rewritten for the original series, and released as #150.

Nancy Drew and Hardy Boys SuperMystery Series (1988–1998)

The Hardy Boys and Nancy Drew teamed up in this 36-volume series of paperbacks. This series follows the formula of the main characters and their friends typically involved in separate mysteries that end up being connected. The sleuths join forces to solve the overall mystery. This series is based in the Nancy Drew Files and Hardy Boys Casefiles continuity, so murder, romance, and flirtation between the series regulars are common. Nancy Drew and Frank Hardy share an attraction in this series, though after a brief kiss in The Last Resort this attraction is not acted on. Subsequent books focus on the respect and friendship that developed between the two and their continued feelings for Ned Nickerson and Callie Shaw. Several spin-off series were cancelled by Simon & Schuster at the end of 1997, including the Nancy Drew and Hardy Boys SuperMystery series.  Starting in 2007, in order to differentiate between the new Super Mystery series, many fans started referring to this series as SuperMystery'88.

Hardy Boys and Tom Swift Ultra Thriller Series (1992–1993)
The two-volume Ultra-Thriller series is a short-lived Hardy Boys spin-off that joined boy inventor Tom Swift with the crime-solving Hardy Boys, Frank and Joe. Although the Franklin W. Dixon pseudonym was used, the series was more akin to the then-current Tom Swift IV series and listed in the Tom Swift books as part of that series. Published as mass-market paperback books under the Archway imprint of Simon & Schuster.  Both books were written by Bill McKay.

 Time Bomb
 The Alien Factor

Collector's editions and foreign publications
From 1998 to 1999, Simon & Schuster published three Hardy Boys Casefiles Collector's Editions that contained three previously published Casefiles stories (Vol. 1 #'s 38, 39 and 40; Vol. 2 #'s 48, 51 and 52; Vol. 3 #'s 55, 58 and 59).  In 2005, Simon & Schuster reprinted Vol. 3 in hardcover with a different cover that used the current Hardy Boys Mystery Stories (Digest) cover of a file folder with modified art from Hardy Boys #152, exclusively for Borders Bookstores.

The Canadian rights to the Casefiles and its spin-offs have been held by Paperjacks (April 1987-December 1989) and Distican, Inc./Simon & Schuster Canada (January 1990 – present; Simon & Schuster US bought out Distican in 2002 and just changed the company name).  Aside from inserting an ad for their 'Books By Mail' program, their address on the copyright page, and a small Maple Leaf with "Printed In Canada" being put on the front covers, and distributing the books, Paperjacks was allowed no other editorial/layout changes to the books.  Once Distican took over the rights in January 1990, the books were all published in the US and just distributed by Distican in Canada with no publishing occurring in Canada.

Simon & Schuster UK have published many 2-in-1 and 3-in-1 books of the Casefiles since the early 1990s in the UK and other British Commonwealth Nations (except Canada).  In 2005/06 Simon & Schuster UK reissued four Casefiles under the Undercover Brothers label, with two other books being planned but cancelled before publication.

Armada/Collins held the UK/British Commonwealth (except Canada) rights to the Casefiles from about 1988 till 1991, with reprint rights continuing throughout the 1990s, allowing Armada to publish different 2-in-1 and 3-in-1 books of the first 10 Casefiles.

The Clues Brothers (1997–2000)
The Clues Brothers books were aimed at younger readers, particularly in third and fourth grades. The series was introduced in 1997 and was cancelled in 2000 for lack of popularity. Starting in 2013 the series is available as ebooks.

This series had some big differences from the other Hardy Boys books, such as:

 The Hardy Boys do not solve major crimes as they do in the others.
 In these books, Joe and Frank are only 8 and 9, unlike the other books where they are 17 and 18.
 They go to Bayport Elementary School; in the others, they go to Bayport High School.

The Hardy Boys: Undercover Brothers (2005–2012)

The Hardy Boys: Undercover Brothers is a series of paperback books which replaced the Digest paperbacks in early 2005.

The Hardy Boys are now agents of A.T.A.C. (American Teens Against Crime) and are solving more realistic and/or violent crimes.

This series is written in first-person narrative style with Frank and Joe alternating chapters.

2005
1. Extreme Danger
2. Running On Fumes
3. Boardwalk Bust
4. Thrill Ride
5. Rocky Road
6. Burned
7. Operation: Survival

2006
8. Top Ten Ways to Die
9. Martial Law
10. Blown Away
11. Hurricane Joe
12. Trouble in Paradise
13. The Mummy's Curse

2007
14. Hazed
15. Death And Diamonds
16. Bayport Buccaneers
17. Murder At The Mall
18. Pushed
19. Foul Play

2008
20. Feeding Frenzy
21. Comic Con Artist
22. Deprivation House (Murder House trilogy)
23. House Arrest
24. Murder House
25. Double Trouble (Double Trouble trilogy)

2009
26.  Double Down
27.  Double Deception
28.  Galaxy X (Galaxy X trilogy)
29.  X-plosion [Galaxy X trilogy]
30.  The X-Factor [Galaxy X trilogy]
31.  Killer Mission (Killer Mystery trilogy)

2010
32.  Private Killer
33.  Killer Connections
34.  The Children of the Lost (Lost Mystery trilogy)
35.  Lost Brother

2011
36.  Forever Lost
37.  Movie Menace (Deathstalker Trilogy)
38.  Movie Mission

2012
39.  Movie Mayhem - last book in series; Hardy Boys UB canceled January 2012
40.  The Case of the MyFace Kidnapper (working title) - series cancelled before publication

Spy Set - box set of volumes 1–4 (2005)

Super Mysteries
 Wanted - 2006
 Kidnapped at the Casino - 2007
 Haunted (Special Ghost Story edition) - 2008

Nancy Drew and the Hardy Boys Super Mystery Series (2007–2012)
The Nancy Drew and the Hardy Boys Super Mystery books are a new series first published in June 2007 and are not to be confused with the Nancy Drew and Hardy Boys SuperMystery series that was published between 1988 and 1998.  Many fans, in order to avoid confusion with the earlier series, refer to this series as the Super Mystery'07 series.

This is a spin-off series of the Nancy Drew: Girl Detective series and The Hardy Boys: Undercover Brothers series. Books are narrated in the first person with chapters alternating between Nancy's, Frank's, and Joe's view. Series was cancelled with Nancy Drew: Girl Detective and The Hardy Boys: Undercover Brothers in 2012.
 Terror on Tour - 2007
 Danger Overseas - 2008
 Club Dread - 2009
 Gold Medal Murder - 2010
 Bonfire Masquerade - 2011
 Stage Fright - 2012

The Hardy Boys: Undercover Brothers Graphic Novels (2005–2010)
The Hardy Boys: Undercover Brothers also appear in a series of graphic novels by Papercutz.

The Hardy Boys: Undercover Brothers – The New Case Files Graphic Novels (2010–2011)
(A new graphic novel series from Papercutz)
 Crawling with Zombies - October 26, 2010
 Break-Up! - March 15, 2011
 Nancy Drew: Girl Detective - The New Case Files #3 / Together With The Hardy Boys - August 2, 2011 (this book is listed as number 3 in the second Nancy Drew graphic novel series, but it is also the 3rd story in the second Hardy Boys graphic novel series and concludes the plot that was begun in The Hardy Boys: Undercover Brothers - The New Case Files #1 and #2, and Nancy Drew: Girl Detective - The New Case Files #1 and #2)

The Hardy Boys Adventures (2013–present)
In 2011, Simon & Schuster cancelled the Undercover Brothers series and launched a new series, Hardy Boys Adventures, publishing four volumes in 2013. The reboot series publishes two to three new titles a year in paperback, hardcover book with dust jacket, and as eBooks. This series is written in the first person with chapters alternating between Frank's and Joe's narration. The first four titles had an initial printing of 25,000 copies in paperback and 2,500 copies in hardcover. Books 5 through 8 had an initial print run of 25,000 in paperback and 5,000 in hardcover. Books 9 and 10 had an initial print run of 10,000 in paperback and 5,000 in hardcover. Audio books were released starting in 2015 on CD and download, read by Tim Gregory. The first three titles were published as a single volume in June 2016 using the cover art from the first book in the series.

Titles

Trivia
The original title for Mystery of the Phantom Heist was Masked Mayhem, and listed as such for pre-order on several online sites before the name change.
The working title for Bound for Danger was Foul Play. This would have been the third use of this title in a Hardy Boys series.
The original book scheduled for February 2019 was The Vanishing Room, and listed for pre-order as such on several online sites. It was later retitled The Disappearance, which had a different plot. The cover art was retained, with only the book title being changed.
The Hardy Boys appear in the Nancy Drew Diaries title A Nancy Drew Christmas, which was released in September 2018.

The Hardy Boys Secret Files (2010–2015)
The Hardy Boys Secret Files is a series begun in 2010 by the publisher Simon & Schuster under their Aladdin imprint. It features the Hardy Boys, Frank and Joe, as grade-school detectives. Three new titles are published yearly as paperback books and eBooks. This series rebooted in 2016 as the Hardy Boys Clue Book series.
 Trouble at the Arcade
 The Missing Mitt
 Mystery Map
 Hopping Mad
 A Monster of a Mystery
 The Bicycle Thief
 The Disappearing Dog
 Sports Sabotage
 The Great Coaster Caper 
 A Rockin' Mystery (October 2012)
 Robot Rumble (April 2013)
 Lights, Camera...Zombies! (August 2013)
 Balloon Blow-Up (December 2013)
 Fossil Frenzy (April 2014)
 Ship of Secrets (August 2014)
 Camping Chaos (December 2014)
 The Great Escape (April 2015)
 Medieval Upheaval (August 2015)
 The Race Is On (December 2015)

The Hardy Boys Clue Book (2016–present)
This is a re-boot of the Hardy Boys Secret Files series published by Aladdin Paperbacks in paperback, hardcover, and eBook editions written by Franklin W. Dixon with covers and internal illustrations by Matt David. Illustrations and cover art for book #7 by Santy Gutierrez. This is an interactive series, as readers will get to write down their clues and predictions. A page before the final chapter has questions the reader can answer regarding suspects, clues, and solutions. The first book in the series references events in the last book of the Hardy Boys Secret Files series, making this a continuation of that series.

Titles

Nancy Drew and The Hardy Boys Dynamite Comic Books (2017)
 Nancy Drew and The Hardy Boys: The Big Lie (March–August 2017, 6 issues): In this modern take, teenage brothers Frank and Joe Hardy are accused of the murder of their father - a detective in the small resort town of Bayport - and must team up with the femme fatale Nancy Drew to prove their innocence (and find the real guilty party in the process) in a twisting, hardboiled tale, complete with double-crosses, deceit, and dames.

Specials
 The Hardy Boys Detective Handbook (1959)
 The Hardy Boys Handbook: Seven Stories of Survival (1980)
 Nancy Drew and the Hardy Boys: Super Sleuths (1981)
 Nancy Drew and the Hardy Boys: Super Sleuths #2 (1984)
 Nancy Drew and the Hardy Boys: Campfire Stories (1984)
 The Hardy Boys Ghost Stories (1984)

Notes

References

Book series introduced in 1927